Alan Brough (born 1967) is a New Zealand actor, television and radio host and comedian based in Australia.

Career

Early life
Brough worked as an actor in Wellington and Auckland, mainly in live theatre. He also appeared in a series of butter commercials as a drag queen called Marge. In 1993, Brough appeared in the New Zealand sitcom Melody Rules (widely regarded as a poor programme, being described as "cringeworthy").

Move to Australia
In 1995, Brough moved to Australia, where he worked on Kath & Kim as well as in films including The Craic, The Nugget and Bad Eggs. He also appeared on a national radio show on Triple M called Tough Love with Mick Molloy and Robyn Butler. He is best known for his role as a team captain on Spicks and Specks.

In 2006, he co-hosted Sammy, Subby and Alan for breakfast on Mix 106.5 Sydney alongside Sammy Power and Subby Valentine. He resigned at the end of 2006.

In 2008, he was appointed as host of the Sunday morning program on 774 ABC Melbourne and across Victoria, replacing Helen Razer. He remained in the position for three years until 2011.

In July 2010, he hosted special events at the Melbourne Cabaret Festival.

Brough had a supporting role in the 2012 Australian comedy Any Questions for Ben?, created by Working Dog Productions.

In 2012, Brough began performing the role of Baron Bomburst in the Australian production of Chitty Chitty Bang Bang.

Personal life
Brough has been with his partner, theatrical agent Helen Townshend, since 1991. They have a daughter, Daisy, born in 2011.

References

External links 
 

New Zealand male television actors
New Zealand male film actors
New Zealand male comedians
1967 births
Living people
People from Hāwera
New Zealand expatriates in Australia